Garrett Michael Shrader (born August 5, 2000) is an American football quarterback for the Syracuse Orange. He previously played for the Mississippi State Bulldogs.

High school career
Shrader attended Charlotte Christian School in Charlotte, North Carolina. During his career he had 9,023 total yards (6,818 passing, 2,205 rushing) and 107 total touchdowns (75 passing, 32 rushing). He committed to Mississippi State University to play college football.

College career
Shrader appeared in 10 games and made four starts his true freshman year at Mississippi State in 2019. He made his first career start against Kentucky, passing for 180 yards and rushing for 125. Overall that season, he completed 88 of 153 passes for 1,170 yards, eight touchdowns and five interceptions and added 587 rushing yards and six touchdowns. Shrader played in four games his sophomore year in 2020 without attempting a pass.

After the 2020 season, Shrader transferred to Syracuse University. He entered his first year at Syracuse as the backup to Tommy DeVito, but took over as the starter for the team's fourth game of the season and remained the starter for the final nine games. For the season, he completed 123 of 234 passes for 1,445 yards, nine touchdowns and four interceptions and rushed for 781 yards on 173 carries with 14 touchdowns. Shrader returned to Syracuse as the team's starter in 2022.

Statistics

References

External links
Syracuse Orange bio

2000 births
Living people
Players of American football from Charlotte, North Carolina
American football quarterbacks
Mississippi State Bulldogs football players
Syracuse Orange football players